The Masonic Home and School of Texas was a home for widows and orphans in what is now Fort Worth, Texas from 1889 to 2005. The first superintendent was Dr. Frank Rainey of Austin, Texas. Starting in 1913, it had its own school system, the Masonic Home Independent School District. Orphan Blake R. Van Leer was the only boy in 1909, went on to become president of Georgia Tech and civil rights advocate.

The campus included buildings designed by architects Wiley G. Clarkson of Fort Worth and Herbert M. Greene of Dallas, and it was listed in the National Register of Historic Places as a historic district in 1992.

Early history

In 1899, the Masons opened a home for widows and orphans of Masons. Later, widows moved to a location in nearby Arlington (closed nearly a century later during the construction of Cowboys Stadium) and the home was opened to non-Masonic orphans. On January 10, 1913, under laws passed in 1905 allowing orphanages to organize their own schools, the Texas State Board of Education created the Masonic Home Independent School District.

The Texas Historical Commission recognizes the fraternal organization foundation as a historic district geographically in the southeast quadrant of Tarrant County, Texas lineate to U.S. Route 287 in Texas.

Football glory
Its 1930s football teams are the subject of a 2007 book by Jim Dent, Twelve Mighty Orphans. In 1995, the Masonic Home won the TAPPS Class 1A State Football Championship in Groesbeck, Texas. under the coaches Tom Hines and Arthur (Buster) Bone, also an ex-student.

The book would later be adapted into a film, 12 Mighty Orphans, in 2021.

Later years

The school closed in 2005 due to lack of funding because of a 6.9 million dollar sexual abuse settlement. The school district merged with the Fort Worth Independent School District and the buildings and grounds were sold to a private developer. The school's chapel is now a private facility known as the Bell Tower Chapel, a popular wedding location.

See also

Grand Lodge of Texas
List of school districts in Texas
University Interscholastic League
F. W. Woolworth Building (Fort Worth, Texas), also by architect Wiley G. Clarkson
National Register of Historic Places listings in Tarrant County, Texas

References

External links

Masonic Children & Family Services in Texas
Masonic Home ISD Profile - Texas Education Agency
 Map of Tarrant County showing area school districts prior to MHISD consolidation - Texas Education Agency - Web version

School districts in Tarrant County, Texas
Former school districts in Texas
Historic districts in Texas
Masonic educational institutions in the United States
School districts in Fort Worth, Texas
School districts disestablished in 2005
National Register of Historic Places in Fort Worth, Texas
2005 disestablishments in Texas